The 1961 Australian GT Championship was a CAMS sanctioned Australian motor racing title for Appendix K GT cars. The title, which was the second Australian GT Championship,  was contested over a single 50 mile race held at the Warwick Farm circuit, in New South Wales, Australia on 30 July 1961. The race was conducted by the Australian Automobile Racing Co.

The championship was won by Frank Matich driving a Jaguar D-Type.

Results

Notes
 Attendance: 25,000
 Number of entries in Official Programme: 33
 Number of starters: 20
 Pole position: Frank Matich (Jaguar D-Type)
 Fastest lap: Frank Matich (Jaguar D-Type), 1:53.5 (71.80 mph)
 Winner's race time: 44:40.8 (69.47 mph)
 Winning margin: 2:07.8

References

Further reading
 Jim Shepherd, A History of Australian Motor Sport, 1980, pages 184-185

External links
 Cusack leads Foley during the 1961 Australian GT Championship

Australian GT Championship
GT Championship
Motorsport at Warwick Farm